Vogelstein is the surname of:

 Bert Vogelstein (born 1949), an American Howard Hughes Medical Institute investigator at The Johns Hopkins University
 Carl Christian Vogel von Vogelstein (1788–1868), German painter
 Rabbi Heinemann Vogelstein (1841–1911), German liberal rabbi
 Rabbi  (1870–1942), German-American historian, liberal rabbi
 Ludwig Vogelstein (1871–1934), German-American industrialist and philanthropist
  (1880–1957), banker and industrialist
 Julie Braun-Vogelstein (1883–1971), German-American art historian, author, editor, and journalist

German-language surnames
Jewish surnames
Jewish families
Yiddish-language surnames